Kalurong or Kalaxung is a mountain located in the Tibet Autonomous Region of China. It is a part of Lhagoi Kangri belt, which is a heteroclite juxtaposition of subranges that is compressed between the Yarlung Tsangpo (Brahmaputra River) river to the north and the Assam Himalaya to the south.

Location 
The superstructure of the mountain is in Central Tibet, south of the Karo La pass.

Climbing history 
In September 2005, a Japanese expedition led by the Keio University Alpine Club made the mountain's first ascent.

References 

Mountains of Tibet